Mary Reynolds may refer to:

Arts
Mary Reynolds (artist) (1891–1950), American artist and bookbinder
Mary Reynolds (landscape designer), Irish landscape designer
Mary Reynolds Aldis (1872–1949), American playwright and poet
Marilyn Miller (born Mary Ellen Reynolds; 1898–1936), American Broadway performer

Others
Lynn Carlin (born 1938), born Mary Reynolds, American former actress
Mary Reynolds (baseball) (1921–1991), American baseball player
Mary Reynolds (politician) (1889–1974), Irish politician and farmer
Mary T. Reynolds (c. 1931–2000), American authority on James Joyce
Mary Palmer (née Reynolds; 1716–1794), British author
Mary Reynolds Babcock (1908–1953), American philanthropist
Ruth Mary Reynolds (1916–1989), American educator and civil rights activist

See also
Debbie Reynolds (born Mary Francis Reynolds) (1932–2016), American actress